Hot Summer Days is a 2010 Hong Kong romantic comedy film featuring an ensemble cast including Nicholas Tse, Jacky Cheung, Daniel Wu, Vivian Hsu, Barbie Shu, Rene Liu, Angelababy and Jing Boran and also featuring a guest appearance by Maggie Cheung. The film was released to celebrate both Chinese New Year and Valentine's Day.

Cast
 Nicholas Tse as Wai
 Jacky Cheung as Wah
 Daniel Wu as Sushi master
 Vivian Hsu as Wasabi
 Barbie Shu as Ding-dong
 Rene Liu as Li Yan
 Duan Yihong as Leslie
 Angelababy as Siu-kei
 Jing Boran as Xiaofang
 Michelle Wai as Model
 Fu Xinbo as Dafu
 Maggie Cheung as Crying Woman
 Gordon Liu as Fai
 Charlene Choi as Bikini Girl
 Shawn Yue as Tattoo Artist
 Fruit Chan as Ice cream vendor
 He Zhuoyan as Xiaoli
 Rosemary Vandenbroucke as Beach Girl
 Kate Yeung as Reporter
 Jan Lamb (voice dubbing)
 Joey Yung (voice dubbing)
 William Chan (unaccredited)

References

External links
 Hot Summer Days film review at LoveHKFilm.com
 
 Hot Summer Days at Hong Kong Cinemagic
 
Hail, Sweat, and Tears: Hot Summer Days review at Asia Pacific Arts

2010 films
2010s Cantonese-language films
2010 romantic comedy films
Hong Kong romantic comedy films
Films set in Hong Kong
Films shot in Hong Kong
2010s Hong Kong films